The Timebroker is a fictional character appearing in American comic books published by Marvel Comics. The character was created by Judd Winick for the comic book Exiles; a psychic construct created by the Timebreakers, a race of alien bug-people who accidentally damaged a large number of alternate universes.

Fictional character biography
The Timebroker first appeared in Exiles #1, when he invited the Age of Apocalypse version of Blink to join a group of dimension-lost superheroes whom he named "The Exiles", whose mission would be to repair the damaged realities, and hopefully, to return home safely. A team member whose home reality is repaired is immediately sent home, and replaced with someone new.

To repair each damaged reality, the Exiles must complete a mission given to them by the Timebroker through a communications device called, "The Tallus," worn by the leader of the group, be it Blink, Mimic, or Sabretooth. These missions are usually humanitarian or super-heroic in nature, but sometimes involve assassination.

The Timebroker also created a separate team of lost heroes, called Weapon X, whose job is mainly wetwork. When they grew out of control, the Timebroker ordered the Exiles and Weapon X to battle each other until only 6 remained alive.

In #53, the Exiles received a warning: "Beware the Timebreaker. He is not what he seems." Almost immediately after, the Timebroker acted irrationally, giving orders to murder the Age of Apocalypse X-Men as well as the Exiles' Mimic. He also did not pop in when Tanaraq and Holocaust attempted to rebel and get their old lives back. The Exiles learned later the true nature of the Timebroker during a raid on Panoptichron, namely that "he" is an illusion created by bug-men.

Later, Mimic used him to convince Blink and the others to cast the infiltrating Hyperion back to his original Earth during a raid on Panoptichron. Heather Hudson used the Tallus in #78 to tell the Exiles and Squadron Supreme about each other to save the Exiles from life in prison. The Timebroker then proceeded to fire the Exiles (albeit temporarily) in #84. He then appeared, controlled by Blink, in "Exiles: Days of Then and Now" when new Exiles needed to be recruited to save a world where the Hulk hijacked the Annihilation Wave. The Timebroker has not appeared since, and oddly enough, the final team of Exiles, led by Blink and coordinated by Morph, Nocturne, and Heather, treat the Timebroker as the Timebreakers' predecessor instead of interface.

References

External links

Comics characters introduced in 2001
Characters created by Judd Winick